Róbert Puci (born 13 June 1973 in Trebišov) is a Slovak politician. He has served as a Member of the National Council since 2012. Until 2020, he was a member of the Direction – Slovak Social Democracy party. During this time, he was known as a staunch loyalist of the party chairman and PM Robert Fico. Nonetheless, in the 2020 party split, he opted to leave Direction and join the Voice – Social Democracy party.

References 

1973 births
Living people
People from Trebišov
Direction – Social Democracy politicians
Members of the National Council (Slovakia) 2012-2016
Members of the National Council (Slovakia) 2016-2020
Members of the National Council (Slovakia) 2020-present